Several Koreans have borne the name Yi Ik.  They are most readily distinguished by their pen names:

Ganong Yi Ik (1579–1624), official exiled during the reign of Gwanghaegun of Joseon
Nongjae Yi Ik (1629–1690), high official under Hyeonjong of Joseon and Sukjong of Joseon
Seongho Yi Ik (1681–1763), early Silhak philosopher and social critic